The American Accountability Foundation (AAF) is an American conservative opposition research group founded in 2020 that has opposed nominees to the Joe Biden administration.

History 
The AAF's executive director and co-founder, Tom Jones, previously worked for Republican senators Ron Johnson, Ted Cruz (directing opposition research for Cruz's 2016 presidential campaign), Jim DeMint, and John Ensign. Its other co-founder, Matthew Buckham, worked in the White House Presidential Personnel Office during the Trump presidency. The New Yorker described the AAF as a dark money group ("a politically active, tax-exempt nonprofit charity that doesn’t disclose its backers") that is an offshoot of  another such group, the Conservative Partnership Institute, which employed Mark Meadows after he left the Trump administration. 

The AAF describes itself as a "charitable and educational organization that conducts non-partisan governmental oversight research and fact-checking so Americans can hold their elected leaders accountable". Jones told Fox News in April 2021 that he aimed to "take a big handful of sand and throw it in the gears of the Biden administration".

Campaigns 
According to The New Yorker, the AAF "aims to thwart the entire Biden slate", and as of April 2022 had targeted 29 nominees. The AAF acknowledged its role in derailing Biden's nominations of David Chipman to be director of the Bureau of Alcohol, Tobacco, Firearms and Explosives in 2021; Sarah Bloom Raskin to be vice-chair for supervision of the Federal Reserve Board in 2022; and David Weil for the Wage and Hour Division of the Department of Labor. The AAF's research was used by Republican opponents of the nomination of Ketanji Brown Jackson for the U.S. Supreme Court in 2022.

In September 2021, the AAF filed an ethics complaint against representative Alexandria Ocasio-Cortez for attending the Met Gala. The AAF claimed that her attendance amounted to accepting an illegal gift since her estimated $35,000 ticket was paid for by Conde Nast, a for-profit company, not a charity. The event itself is however a charitable fundraiser.

References

External links
 

2020 establishments in the United States
Educational organizations established in 2020
Educational charities based in the United States
Conservative organizations in the United States